Emirhan Topçu (born 11 October 2000) is a Turkish professional footballer who plays as a centre back for Çaykur Rizespor.

Professional career
Topçu is a youth product of Çaykur Rizespor, and joined Čelik Zenica on loan 13 February 2020. He made his debut with Čelik Zenica in a 2-1 :Premier League of Bosnia and Herzegovina loss to FK Sloboda Tuzla on 7 March 2020.

International career
Topçu was first called up to the Turkey U21s in May 2022 for a set of 2023 UEFA European Under-21 Championship qualification matches.

References

External links
 
 

2000 births
Living people
People from Bandırma
Turkish footballers
Turkish expatriate footballers
Çaykur Rizespor footballers
NK Čelik Zenica players
TFF First League players
Association football fullbacks
Turkish expatriate sportspeople in Bosnia and Herzegovina
Premier League of Bosnia and Herzegovina players
Expatriate footballers in Bosnia and Herzegovina